Aaron Pritchett (born August 2, 1970) is a Canadian country music singer. He has one #1 hit on the Billboard Canada Country chart with "Better When I Do".

Biography
Pritchett got his start as a DJ at Rooster's Country Cabaret bar in Pitt Meadows, BC, and played in a house band performing cover tunes. He recorded his first album in 1996 titled Young in Love. In 2001, after years of playing clubs in BC and Alberta, Pritchett entered a singing contest called "Project Discovery" sponsored by CMT and won a professional music video directed by internationally acclaimed director, Steven Goldmann as well as $10,000 cash.  He put the money towards recording his first album to see any radio success, titled "Consider This".  The title track was co-written by Pritchett and BC Country legend Rick Tippe.

Pritchett's success continued with the release of his next albums "Something Going On Here" in 2003 and "Big Wheel" in 2006.

In 2008 he was signed to 604 Records, the production company of Nickelback's Chad Kroeger. Pritchett toured Western Canada with Toby Keith and fellow 604 Records artist Jessie Farrell to promote his album, Thankful, which was released on September 9, 2008.

Pritchett released the album In the Driver's Seat on November 9, 2010, under his own record label Decibel Music.

Pritchett's first greatest hits album, Body of Work: A Collection of Hits, was released on May 12, 2015. under Big Star Recordings.

In June 2016, Pritchett released the much anticipated album The Score, a title that commemorated his 20th year recording and releasing music.  The lead off single "Dirt Road In Em" went to No. 6 on the charts and marked a real comeback in Pritchett's career as he hadn't had a top 10 single since 2009. The second release, "Out Of The Blue" followed suit reaching No. 9. The album was nominated for Country Album of the Year at the 2017 Juno Awards.  His release "When A Momma's Boy Meets A Daddy's Girl" peaked at No. 5 on the Billboard Canada Country chart.

In April 2019, Pritchett scored his first #1 hit on the Billboard Canada Country chart with "Better When I Do".

Band

Current
Jayson Brinkworth – Drums
John Sponarski – Guitar, Vocals
Scott Smith – Guitar, Steel Guitar, Vocals
Shane Hendrickson – Bass, Vocals
Emil Gawaziuk – Monitors, stage tech
Kirby Barber – Guitar, vocals

Former
Mitch Merrett
Jay Buettner
Mike Sanyshyn
Ron Briggs
Mike Norman
Dennis Marcenko
Darren Parris
Bruce Morrison
Peter Sweetzir
Ken Friesen

Discography

Albums

Studio albums

Compilation albums

Extended plays

Singles

2000s

2010s-20s

Featured singles

Other charted songs

Guest appearances

Music videos

Awards and nominations

References

External links
 Aaron Pritchett
 https://web.archive.org/web/20111114185423/http://www.decibelmusic.ca/

1970 births
Living people
People from Terrace, British Columbia
Canadian male singer-songwriters
Canadian country singer-songwriters
Musicians from Vancouver
21st-century Canadian male singers
Canadian Country Music Association Songwriter(s) of the Year winners